The 2018 ManBetX Champion of Champions was a professional non-ranking snooker tournament which took place from 5 to 11 November 2018 at the Ricoh Arena in Coventry, England.

Shaun Murphy was the defending champion, but lost 3–6 in the semi-finals to Ronnie O'Sullivan in a repeat of the final of the previous edition of the tournament.

Ronnie O'Sullivan defeated Kyren Wilson 10–9 in the final to capture his third Champion of Champions title.

Prize fund
The breakdown of prize money for 2018 is shown below:

 Winner: £100,000
 Runner-up: £50,000
 Losing semi-finalist: £25,000
 Group runner-up: £17,500
 First round losers: £12,500
 Total: £370,000

Qualification
Qualification for the 2018 Champion of Champions tournament was determined by the winners of (at most) 26 tournaments over a one-year period, from the 2017 Champion of Champions to the 2018 International Championship, thereby including tournaments from both the 2017/2018 and 2018/2019 snooker seasons. The winners of the first 16 tournaments on the list were guaranteed qualification. The winners of the next tournaments on the list – in the order shown in the table – would also take a place in the Champion of Champions if other players would win more than one of the tournaments higher on the list.

In case less than 16 different tournament winners qualified, the remaining spots would be awarded based on the world rankings after the 2018 English Open.

Main draw

Final

Century breaks
Total: 31

 147, 100  Mark Selby
 140, 123, 119, 109, 102, 102  Mark Allen
 139  Ding Junhui
 137, 131, 129, 127, 116, 114, 110, 109, 109, 107, 101  Ronnie O'Sullivan
 131, 125, 125, 104  Kyren Wilson
 123, 118, 110, 102  Shaun Murphy
 106, 100  John Higgins
 106  Ryan Day

References

External links
 

2018
2018 in snooker
2018 in English sport
Sports competitions in Coventry
2010s in Coventry
Champion of Champions